Tityus is a mythological painting by Titian dating to 1549 in the Museo del Prado, Madrid. It shows the punishment of the giant Tityos from Greek mythology.

References

External links
 

1549 paintings
Paintings by Titian in the Museo del Prado
Nude art
Paintings depicting Greek myths
Birds in art
Mythological paintings by Titian